Reining is a surname. Notable people with the surname include:
Lucia Reining (born 1961), German physicist
Maria Reining (1903–1991), Austrian soprano
Priscilla Reining (1923–2007), American applied anthropologist

Surnames from given names